Moon Dae-seong (Hangul: 문대성; Hanja: 文大成; born 15 March 1986) is a South Korean footballer.

He dropped out of the club on 12 August 2011.

References

External links 
 

1986 births
Living people
South Korean footballers
K League 1 players
Jeonbuk Hyundai Motors players
Seongnam FC players
Ulsan Hyundai FC players
Association football forwards